The Irregular at Magic High School is a 2014 science fiction Japanese anime series of the light novel series of the same name written by Tsutomu Satō.

The anime is produced by Madhouse and directed by Manabu Ono, along with original character designs by Kana Ishida and soundtrack music by Taku Iwasaki. The series ran on Tokyo MX, GTV, and GYT in Japan from April 6 to September 28, 2014 with later airings on MBS, CTC, tvk, TV Saitama, TV Aichi, TVQ, TVh, AT-X, BS11. The anime has been licensed for streaming by Aniplex of America.

At the "Dengeki Bunko Aki no Namahōsō Festival" event on October 6, 2019, a second season of the anime series was announced and originally scheduled to air in July 2020, which will adapt the "Visitor Arc" in the novel series, but it aired from October 4 to December 27, 2020 due to the COVID-19 pandemic. The main staff and cast from the 2017 film are reprising their roles in the second season.

After the end of the series, it was revealed that the spin-off manga series, The Honor Student at Magic High School would get an anime television series adaptation in 2021.

On February 28, 2021, an anime adaptation of the "Reminiscence Arc" has been announced. It was later revealed to be a 60-minute episode, with the main cast and staff of the second season reprising their roles. It aired on December 31, 2021. On January 1, 2022, a sequel anime was announced.

Series overview

Episode list

Season 1 (2014)

Season 2 (2020)

Special: Reminiscence Arc (2021)

See also
List of The Honor Student at Magic High School episodes

References

External links
 Official anime website 
 Official anime website

 
Irregular at Magic High School, The